Dénes Rósa (born 7 April 1977 in Budapest) is a former Hungarian international footballer, who last played for Hungarian First League club Ferencváros.

Playing career 

Rósa played for a number of clubs in his homeland of Hungary, ending up at Ferencváros where he won the league and cup double in 2004. He played in six European ties (both UEFA Cup and Champions League qualifiers) during his spell here, scoring six times.

He moved on loan to English Championship side Wolves in January 2006 on a six-month trial contract, where he linked up with former Ferencváros teammate Gábor Gyepes. He made his debut for the club on 2 January 2006 in a 2–0 defeat at Coventry City, and went on to make nine league appearances in the rest of the campaign, scoring twice. At the end of the season, Rosa and Wolves agreed a three-year contract.

However, the surprise departure of Glenn Hoddle and arrival of Mick McCarthy as manager in the summer saw him left out of first team contention afterwards. McCarthy admitted that Rosa may struggle to figure in his formation. The midfielder was loaned to League One Cheltenham Town for a month in the spring of 2007, but he was then put on the transfer list by Wolves. He made a brief substitute appearance for Wolves in the League Cup during the following season, but despite a strong goalscoring record in reserve games, never featured in the first team again.

Rósa finally left Wolves on 13 January 2009, after having his contract cancelled by mutual consent. Shortly afterwards, he signed for Scottish club Hibernian after a successful trial. He played 12 times for Hibs before leaving the club at the end of his contract. Soon afterwards, the Edinburgh Evening News claimed that Rosa was a target for city rivals Hearts, but he instead returned to Ferencvaros.

Rosa went on trial with Sunderland in February 2012.

National team 

Dénes Rósa making his debut on 1 June 2004, in Tianjin against China.

(Statistics correct as of 2 December 2011)

References

External links 
 Data page and pictures of Dénes Rósa at magyarfutball.hu
 
 
 Dénes Rósa at HLSZ

1977 births
Living people
Footballers from Budapest
Hungarian footballers
Hungary international footballers
Budapesti VSC footballers
Győri ETO FC players
Soproni FAC footballers
Dunaújváros FC players
Újpest FC players
Ferencvárosi TC footballers
English Football League players
Wolverhampton Wanderers F.C. players
Cheltenham Town F.C. players
Scottish Premier League players
Hibernian F.C. players
Hungarian expatriate footballers
Expatriate footballers in England
Expatriate footballers in Scotland
Hungarian expatriate sportspeople in England
Hungarian expatriate sportspeople in Scotland
Association football midfielders